Haley Kalil (née O'Brien; born August 6, 1992) is an American model. In 2018, Kalil was featured in the Sports Illustrated Swimsuit Issue as a contestant in the first ever Sports Illustrated Swim Search. As one of the two winners of the competition, alongside Camille Kostek, she officially appeared in the 2019 edition as a rookie.

Prior to her career as a model, Kalil competed in beauty pageants. As a teenager, she was crowned Miss Minnesota Teen USA 2010 and later competed in Miss Teen USA 2010. Afterwards, Kalil was crowned Miss Minnesota USA 2014, and placed in the top twenty in Miss USA 2014.

Haley married former NFL lineman Matt Kalil in 2015, before filing for divorce in 2022.

Early life and education
Kalil was born Haley O'Brien in Excelsior, Minnesota. She is the middle child of three; Kalil has an elder sister and a younger brother.  She attended St. Cloud State University in St. Cloud, Minnesota, where she graduated summa cum laude with a Bachelor of Science in medical biology and psychology, and a minor in chemistry.

Career

Pageantry
Kalil began her career in pageantry at the age of 16, competing in Miss Minnesota Teen USA 2009, where she placed as the third runner-up behind eventual winner Vanessa Johnston. She returned to the competition the following year and was crowned Miss Minnesota Teen USA 2010. As Miss Minnesota Teen USA, Kalil earned the right to represent Minnesota at the Miss Teen USA 2010 competition, held at Atlantis Paradise Island in Paradise Island, Bahamas. She did not place in the competition, with the eventual winner being Kamie Crawford of Maryland.

In 2013, while a senior in college, Kalil competed in Miss Minnesota USA 2014 in Burnsville, Minnesota. She went on to be crowned the winner, and earned the right to represent Minnesota at Miss USA 2014 in Baton Rouge, Louisiana. At Miss USA, Kalil placed within the top twenty contestants, before losing out the crown to Nia Sanchez of Nevada. After completing her reign as Miss Minnesota USA, Kalil crowned Jessica Scheu as her successor, and retired from pageantry.

She judged Miss USA 2021 competition.

Modeling
In 2017, Kalil took part in the Sports Illustrated Swim Search. She advanced from her original application to one of the top 35, and later top fifteen contestants. As a member of the top fifteen, Kalil modeled in Miami to debut Sports Illustrated Swimsuit Swim and Active apparel lines.  She later advanced to the top six, and was invited for a shoot in the 2018 issue as a model search contestant.

In March 2018, it was announced that Kalil had been selected as one of the two winners of the competition, alongside Camille Kostek. She appeared as a rookie model in the 2019 edition, and also appeared in the 2020 and 2021 Sports Illustrated Swimsuit Issue editions. 

In 2018, Kalil was signed to Wilhelmina Models New York, but stated in March 2023 that she would no longer work with modeling agencies citing negative experiences.

YouTube
In November 2022 Haley posted her first vlog to her YouTube channel @haleyybaylee. She posts YouTube Shorts multiple times per day, usually focusing on comedy. She also posts weekly vlogs that center more on serious content and discussions. On February 5, 2023, Haley hit the 1 million subscriber mark on her YouTube channel. She has amassed followings on Tiktok and Instagram (both with the same username @haleyybaylee) with 2.7 million and 546k followers respectively.

Personal life
On July 8, 2015, Kalil married American football player Matt Kalil in a ceremony in Kauai, Hawaii. The following year, on July 8, they renewed their vows in a formal ceremony with family and friends, celebrating a year of marriage. She filed for divorce on May 4, 2022.

In 2022, Kalil was diagnosed with endometriosis, urethritis and ovarian cysts, and underwent surgery to remove the tissue from endometriosis and the scar tissue from urethritis.

References

External links

1992 births
American beauty pageant winners
American female models
St. Cloud State University alumni
Female models from Minnesota
Living people
Miss USA 2014 delegates
People from Excelsior, Minnesota
21st-century American women